The Tubeufiaceae are a family of fungi in the order Tubeufiales of the class Dothideomycetes. The family was circumscribed in 1979 by mycologist Margaret Elizabeth Barr-Bigelow.

Genera

Acanthostigma
Acanthophiobolus
Acanthostigmella
Allonecte
Amphinectria
Boerlagiomyces
Byssocallis
Chaetocrea
Chaetosphaerulina
Glaxoa
Letendraeopsis
Lichenotubeufia  – 8 spp.
Malacaria
Melioliphila
Paranectriella
Podonectria
Puttemansia
Rebentischia
Taphrophila
Thaxteriella
Thaxteriellopsis
Thaxterina
Titea
Tubeufia
Uredinophila

References

 
Dothideomycetes families
Taxa named by Margaret Elizabeth Barr-Bigelow
Taxa described in 1979